The women's 100 metre backstroke S6 event at the 2016 Paralympic Games took place on 8 September, at the Olympic Aquatics Stadium. Two heats were held, one with six swimmers and one with five. The swimmers with the eight fastest times advanced to the final.

Heats

Heat 1 
9:42 8 September 2016:

Heat 2 
9:42 8 September 2016:

Final 
17:37 8 September 2016:

References

Swimming at the 2016 Summer Paralympics